Heterostraci (Ancient Greek, ἕτερος+ὄστρακον "those [with] a different shell" [-i is pl. of -us]) is an extinct subclass of pteraspidomorph jawless vertebrate that lived primarily in marine and estuary environments. Heterostraci existed from the mid-Ordovician to the conclusion of the Devonian.

Description and anatomy 
The Heterostracans differed from other Paleozoic agnathan taxa both in the arrangement and histology of their scales.

Most heterostracans had two plates which form a large dorsal shield and a large ventral shield, and had series of scales arranged in various patterns on the sides of their bodies, the exact pattern differing from one group to another. In a few primitive forms, such as Lepidaspis, the dorsal and ventral shields are composed of a mosaic of tiny scales. In most other known forms, though, these tiny scales have fused together to form the shield-plates.

The scales of heterostracans are histologically distinct from other vertebrates, having three layers composed of dentine and aspidine, an acellular bony tissue unique to animals of this class and Thelodonti. The middle layer was honeycombed with tiny spaces called "cancella."

As with many agnathan groups, heterostracans had no fins besides the tail or caudal fin. In some pteraspids, especially in the psammosteids, the ends of the branchial plates (the plates that covered the gills) is drawn out to form wing-like extensions.

Taxonomy
Heterostraci are divided into several orders, including the two most diverse orders, Cyathaspidiformes ("Cup Shields"), and Pteraspidiformes ("Wing Shields"), as well as the Cardipeltida, Corvaspidida, Tolypelepidida, Tesseraspidida, and the Traquairaspidiformes. The predominantly Silurian Tolypelepidida (the best known member being Athenaegis), is regarded as being a sister group of the Cyathaspids and Pteraspidids, while the Early Devonian Lepidaspis is regarded as being incertae sedis, possibly close to the original basal forms.

Cyathaspidiformes
Cyathaspidiformes is divided into two main subgroups: the Amphiaspidida of Early Devonian Siberia (i.e., Amphiaspis, Gabreyaspis, and Edaphaspis, grouped together with their relative Ctenaspis of Canada), and the Cyathaspidida (i.e., Cyathaspis, Poraspis, and Anglaspis), grouped together with their relative Nahanbiaspis.

Pteraspidiformes
The Pteraspidiformes is divided up into  five families, four of which, Anchipteraspididae, Gigantaspididae, Pteraspididae, and Protaspididae are monophyletic: Protopteraspididae has recently been determined to be paraphyletic within Pteraspidiformes, and thus, no longer valid, while Psammosteidae is now regarded as a separate subtaxon within Pteraspidiformes, "Psammosteida," as the sister taxon of the most basal family, Anchipteraspidae.  Pteraspididae, Gigantaspididae and Protaspididae, in turn form the suborder Pteraspidoidei, with various genera of Protopteraspididae as sister taxa.

Phylogeny
Based on the work of Mikko Haaramo.

See also 
 Astraspidida
 Thelodonti
 Galeaspida
 Osteostraci
 Lepidaspis

References

External links 
 tolweb.org
 pwrmark.biology.ualberta.ca
 geol.lsu.edu

 
Vertebrate subclasses

de:Pteraspidomorphi#Heterostraci